Colobothea emarginata is a species of beetle in the family Cerambycidae. It was described by Olivier in 1795. It is known from Brazil.

References

emarginata
Beetles described in 1795